Brassia maculata, the spotted brassia, is a species of orchid. It is native to southern Mexico (Chiapas, Veracruz, Tabasco, Guerrero, Oaxaca, Campeche, Quintana Roo), Central America (Belize, Guatemala, El Salvador, Honduras, Nicaragua), Cuba, and Jamaica.

References

External links
IOSPE orchid photos
Orchideen Zentrum Celle, Brassia maculata 

maculata
Orchids of Belize
Orchids of Mexico
Orchids of Central America
Flora of Cuba
Orchids of Jamaica
Plants described in 1813
Flora without expected TNC conservation status